Methyluridine may refer to:

 3-Methyluridine
 5-Methyluridine